Xanthophyllum ramiflorum is a plant in the family Polygalaceae. The specific epithet  is from the Latin meaning "flowering on the branches".

Description
The bark is pale brown. The flowers are white, drying yellowish.

Distribution and habitat
Xanthophyllum ramiflorum is endemic to Borneo. Its habitat is peatswamp and kerangas forests.

References

ramiflorum
Endemic flora of Borneo
Plants described in 1970